{{infobox tennis match
| match desc = French Open 2009 Men's Final
| match date = Sunday June 7, 2009
| tournament = French Open
| location   = Paris, France
| umpire     = Pascal Maria
| duration   = 1 hour 55 minutes
| player1    =  Roger Federer
| player2    =  Robin Söderling
| p1 s1 = 6
| p2 s1 = 1
| p1 s2 = 77
| p2 s2 = 61
| p1 s3 = 6| p2 s3 = 4
| p1 s4 = 
| p2 s4 = 
| p1 s5 = 
| p2 s5 = 
| image = 
| p1 image =
| p2 image =
| p1 image cap = Roger Federer tied the all-time Slam record and completed the Career Slam
| p1 image size = 300
| p2 image cap =
| p1 seed = 2
| p2 seed = 23
| h2h = Federer 9–0 Söderling
}}

The 2009 French Open Men's Singles final''' was the championship tennis match of the Men's Singles tournament at the 2009 French Open. It was contested by three-time finalist Roger Federer and Robin Söderling of Sweden. After years of heartbreak in Paris, Federer finally lifted the Coupe des Mousquetaires and solidified his position in the mind of many tennis observers as the greatest male player of all-time.

This match was historic as it was Federer's fourteenth major title, which brought him to a tie with Pete Sampras for the all-time record of Grand Slam championships. He also became only the third man in the Open Era to complete the career Grand Slam of capturing the Australian Open, French Open, Wimbledon and US Open championships.

Background 

After falling to three time French Open champion Gustavo Kuerten in 2004, Federer's frustration in Paris was due solely to his arch-rival Rafael Nadal. They first played in the 2005 semifinals and then again in the finals in 2006, 2007, and 2008. During this four year period Federer compiled a 23–0 record against all other players at Roland Garros and an 0–4 record against Nadal; whose high bouncing lefty forehand to Federer's one handed backhand ground him down on the dirt year after year.

Federer entered the tournament with some momentum having defeated Nadal on clay for the first time since 2007 in the previous tournament at the Madrid Masters. However, the four-time reigning champion Nadal was a massive favorite still never having been defeated in Paris. Federer struggled through difficult matches in the early rounds, while Nadal bulldozed his way into the last 16.

The entire complexion of the tournament changed when Nadal was blitzed off the court in four sets by a six foot, four inch Swede Robin Söderling, who took Nadal's high bouncing shots at chest height and punished them for winners. Many observers labeled this match one of the most shocking results in, not just tennis, but sports history. With Nadal's early exit, all the pressure was suddenly on Federer to capture the French Open without having to face his kryptonite on clay (this would prove to be the only year Nadal did not make the final between 2005 and 2014).

The next day Federer came out tight against German Tommy Haas and was virtually buried being down 0–2 in sets and 30–40 at 3–4 in the third set. Federer then hit an inside-out forehand on the line to save the break point and went on the complete a miraculous 5 set comeback 6–7(4–7), 5–7, 6–4, 6–0, 6–2. After dismissing Gael Monfils in the quarterfinals, Federer faced rising star Juan Martin del Potro in the semifinals. Federer again in trouble, losing two of the first three sets, before again bearing down to come through in another five set thriller 3–6, 7–6(7–2), 2–6, 6–1, 6–4.  With this victory Federer reached his fourth consecutive final in Paris and first against someone other than Nadal. Söderling had backed up his momentous victory over Nadal with wins over Nikolay Davydenko and Fernando Gonzalez to meet Federer in the final.

Match details 
The chair umpire was Pascal Maria (fr) of France.

Unlike the three previous years Federer had been in the final, the day was overcast and soggy, creating slower conditions and lower bounces. Federer started strongly capturing the first set 6–1. 

The second set was interrupted with Söderling serving on serve in the fourth game, when a member of the crowd charged onto the court and ran towards Federer waving a flag and placing a jesters hat upon the Swiss player's head. The fan then evaded security and leapt over the net and ran towards Söderling before being tackled by a security guard and removed from the court. This was a serious violation, especially following the on-court stabbing of Monica Seles by a spectator in 1993. Following the interruption both players held serve in the set and it went to a tiebreaker. Federer then played what he later described as the greatest tiebreaker of his career, taking it by a score of 7–1.

The third set opened with Federer breaking the Söderling serve. Both players then held serve for the next nine games, culminating in Federer serving out the match. In the final game Federer faced a break point and said in his post match press conference that the emotions in the final game made "it almost unplayable." Directly after the conclusion of the match the rain began to pour, which meant if Söderling had broken back and forced it to a fourth set the match would have been suspended to the next day.

During the trophy ceremony Federer was presented with the trophy by American legend Andre Agassi who, along with Rod Laver, was the only other man in the Open Era to complete the career Grand Slam. As the Swiss national anthem played Federer was overcome with emotion after finally capturing the elusive title at Roland Garros.

Statistics 

Source

Significance 

This match was momentous in the history of tennis. After missing the chance to equal Pete Sampras' then-record of fourteen Grand Slam championships of all time when he lost to Rafael Nadal in the final of the Australian Open earlier in the year, Federer finally did so by winning the French Open for the first time. Sampras himself commented on Federer following the victory saying, "Regardless he [Federer] goes down as the greatest ever. This just confirms it." Federer also filled the only void on his resume by capturing the French Open and becoming only the third man in the Open Era to capture the career Grand Slam.

Many tennis analysts and commentators proclaimed Federer the greatest male player of all-time, including tennis legend John McEnroe who called the match for NBC. The call by Eurosport on match point was thus: "Federer wins the French Open for the first time in his career; and in addition must surely be regarded now as the greatest male player of all-time."

This tournament also transformed Söderling's career as he went from a top thirty player to a perennial top ten player, reaching a high of number 4 in the world. Söderling remained a fixture in the top ten from 2009–2011 until he was forced to stop playing, while still ranked number 5 in the world, and ultimately had to retire after contracting a serious case of mononucleosis.

See also 

 2007 Wimbledon Championships – Men's singles final
 2009 Wimbledon Championships – Men's singles final
 2012 Wimbledon Championships – Men's singles final
 2016 French Open – Men's singles final
 2017 Australian Open – Men's singles final

References

External links 
 Head to Head player details at the ATP's official site
 Match details at the ATP's site

2009
Roger Federer tennis matches
2009 French Open